The Cambridge Agreement was signed, on August 29, 1629, between the shareholders of the Massachusetts Bay Company, at Cambridge in England.

Under its terms, those who intended to emigrate to the New World could purchase shares held by those shareholders who wanted to remain home.  Thus the agreement was a precursor to the foundation of Boston, Massachusetts.

The Cambridge Agreement stipulated that the Massachusetts Bay Colony would be under local control in New England, rather than controlled by a corporate board based in London. Not all the shareholders of the Company had any intention of emigrating, despite their Puritan sympathies. In return for guaranteeing local control over the colony, the non-emigrating shareholders were bought out by the emigrating shareholders. John Winthrop led the Company's emigrating party following these negotiations and was elected Colonial Governor in October 1629.

The agreement guaranteed the Massachusetts Colony would be self-governing, answerable only to the English Crown. The Colony and the Company then became, to all intents and purposes, one and the same. Winthrop's Puritans carried this Charter across the Atlantic arriving at America in 1630.

12 Signatories:
 Richard Saltonstall
 Thomas Dudley
 William Vassall
 Nicholas West
 Isaac Johnson
 John Humphrey
 Thomas Sharp
 Increase Nowell
 John Winthrop
 William Pynchon
 Kellam Browne
 William Colbron

References

Further reading

Notes
see: Text of the Agreement

Pre-statehood history of Massachusetts
History of the Thirteen Colonies
1629 in the Thirteen Colonies
1629 in England